Elections to Lisburn City Council were held on 5 May 2011 on the same day as the other Northern Irish local government elections. The election used five district electoral areas to elect a total of 30 councillors.

Election results

Note: "Votes" are the first preference votes.

Districts summary

|- class="unsortable" align="centre"
!rowspan=2 align="left"|Ward
! % 
!Cllrs
! % 
!Cllrs
! %
!Cllrs
! %
!Cllrs
! % 
!Cllrs
! %
!Cllrs
!rowspan=2|TotalCllrs
|- class="unsortable" align="center"
!colspan=2 bgcolor="" | DUP
!colspan=2 bgcolor="" | Sinn Féin
!colspan=2 bgcolor="" | UUP
!colspan=2 bgcolor="" | Alliance
!colspan=2 bgcolor="" | SDLP
!colspan=2 bgcolor="white"| Others
|-
|align="left"|Downshire
|bgcolor="#D46A4C"|53.2
|bgcolor="#D46A4C"|3
|1.4
|0
|24.0
|1
|14.3
|1
|3.4
|0
|3.7
|0
|5
|-
|align="left"|Dunmurry Cross
|10.8
|1
|bgcolor="#008800"|65.7
|bgcolor="#008800"|5
|3.3
|1
|4.4
|0
|15.8
|1
|0.0
|0
|7
|-
|align="left"|Killultagh
|bgcolor="#D46A4C"|47.7
|bgcolor="#D46A4C"|3
|9.0
|0
|16.8
|1
|10.4
|0
|10.5
|1
|5.6
|0
|5
|-
|align="left"|Lisburn Town North
|bgcolor="#D46A4C"|47.8
|bgcolor="#D46A4C"|3
|4.5
|0
|25.0
|2
|14.0
|1
|5.8
|1
|2.9
|0
|7
|-
|align="left"|Lisburn Town South
|bgcolor="#D46A4C"|60.9
|bgcolor="#D46A4C"|4
|3.6
|0
|17.0
|1
|9.7
|1
|5.2
|0
|3.6
|0
|6
|- class="unsortable" class="sortbottom" style="background:#C9C9C9"
|align="left"| Total
|41.0
|14
|20.3
|5
|16.6
|5
|10.4
|3
|8.8
|3
|2.9
|0
|30
|-
|}

Districts results

Downshire

2005: 2 x DUP, 2 x UUP, 1 x Alliance
2011: 3 x DUP, 1 x UUP, 1 x Alliance
2005-2011 Change: DUP gain from UUP

Dunmurry Cross

2005: 4 x Sinn Féin, 2 x SDLP, 1 x DUP
2011: 5 x Sinn Féin, 1 x SDLP, 1 x DUP
2005-2011 Change: Sinn Féin gain from SDLP

Killultagh

2005: 3 x DUP, 1 x UUP, 1 x SDLP
2011: 3 x DUP, 1 x UUP, 1 x SDLP
2005-2011 Change: No change

Lisburn Town North

2005: 3 x DUP, 3 x UUP, 1 x Alliance
2011: 3 x DUP, 2 x UUP, 1 x Alliance, 1 x SDLP
2005-2011 Change: SDLP gain from UUP

Lisburn Town South

2005: 4 x DUP, 1 x UUP, 1 x Alliance
2011: 4 x DUP, 1 x UUP, 1 x Alliance
2005-2011 Change: No change

References

Lisburn City Council elections
Lisburn